KDES-FM (98.5 MHz) is a radio station in the Palm Springs area and the Coachella Valley of Southern California.

KDES-FM began in 1957 on the AM dial at 920 kHz and was affiliated with ABC Radio. KDES-FM (then called KGEC) went on-air in 1963, then adopted the top 40/pop music format in 1975. It switched to an oldies format in 1988. The AM station dropped oldies in 1995, replacing them with news/talk KPSI.

KDES-FM's studio headquarters are in Palm Springs. In the 2000s, KDES-FM's signal covers a  radius area, from Beaumont to the Morongo Basin to the Imperial Valley.

Around September–November 2005, KDES-FM shifted from conventional oldies (1950s–1960s) to more of a "Classic Hits" leaning oldies format by expanding its playlist to include more 1970s hits before ultimately excluding 1950s hits in January 2006.

In January 2010, KDES-FM announced plans to move its oldies format to KWXY-FM's former frequency. At the same time, the station would incorporate 1980s hits into their playlist after sister-station KPSI-FM withdrew from playing 80s music. This decision brought an end to KWXY-FM's beautiful music format, which has moved to AM 1340. KDES vacated its original frequency of 104.7 on February 2. The frequency was sold and moved out of the market by its new owners.

On September 9, 2015, shortly after being sold to Alpha Media, KDES-FM began simulcasting KDGL, with a change to Country as "98.5 The Bull" to follow the next day, launching with the usual 10,000 songs in a row, with the first song being "This Is How We Roll" by Florida-Georgia Line.

HD2 subchannel
KDES-FM airs an adult standards format branded "Mod FM" on its HD2 subchannel, which is also heard at 107.3 FM, through translator K297BO.

References

External links
Official Website

DES-FM
Country radio stations in the United States
Mass media in Riverside County, California
Cathedral City, California
Alpha Media radio stations